The Iron Man & Other Tales of the Ring is a collection of short stories about boxing by Robert E. Howard.  It was first published in 1976 by Donald M. Grant, Publisher, Inc. in an edition of 1,600 copies.

Contents

 Introduction, by Donald M. Grant
 "Men of Iron"
 "The Iron Man"
 "They Always Come Back"
 "Fists of the Desert"

References

1976 short story collections
Short story collections by Robert E. Howard
Donald M. Grant, Publisher books